The Sexual Offences Act 1985 (c.44) was an Act of the Parliament of the United Kingdom that created two offences concerning prostitution, and increased the maximum sentence for attempted rape from seven years to life imprisonment. The act was applicable in England and Wales only.

The new offences were kerb crawling and persistently soliciting women for the purposes of prostitution. In 1991 the Director of Public Prosecutions and head of the Crown Prosecution Service, Sir Allan Green KCB QC, was arrested for an offence under this Act and had to resign.

Sections 3, 4(2) and (3), and 5(2) were repealed by Schedule 7 to the Sexual Offences Act 2003.

The whole Act was repealed by the Policing and Crime Act 2009.

Provisions
S1 Kerb-crawling
(1) A man commits an offence if he solicits a woman (or different women) for the purpose of prostitution—
(a) from a motor vehicle while it is in a street or public place; or
b) in a street or public place while in the immediate vicinity of a motor vehicle that he has just got out of or off,persistently or, subject to section 5(6) below, in such manner or in such circumstances as to be likely to cause annoyance to the woman (or any of the women) solicited, or nuisance to other persons in the neighbourhood.

S2 Persistent soliciting of women for the purpose of prostitution
(1) A man commits an offence if in a street or public place he persistently solicits a woman (or different women) for the purpose of prostitution.

S3 Penalties for certain sexual offences
(1) Schedule 2 to the [1956 c. 69.] Sexual Offences Act 1956 (which shows the penalties which may be imposed for offences under that Act and attempts to commit certain of those offences) shall be amended as follows.
(2) In paragraph 1(b) (attempted rape), in the third column, for " Seven years " there shall be substituted " Life ".
(3) In paragraph 17 (indecent assault on a woman), in the third column, for " If on a girl under thirteen who is stated to have been so in the indictment, five years; otherwise two years " there shall be substituted " Ten years ".

References

See also
Prostitution in the United Kingdom
Sexual Offences Act
Attempted Rape Act 1948

English criminal law
United Kingdom Acts of Parliament 1985
Sex crimes in the United Kingdom
Prostitution law in the United Kingdom